Denis Lavagne (born 9 July 1964) is a French football coach and former player who manages Saudi Arabian club Al-Jabalain.

Playing career
Born in Béziers, Lavagne played for Le Havre B, Rouen B, Béziers, Alès, Orange and Alès B.

Coaching career
After retiring from playing in 1989, Lavagne worked as an assistant manager with Alès, Nîmes, Bastia and ASOA Valence. He then worked as manager of Béziers Deveze between 1998 and 1999, before becoming a coach at Sedan and manager of Sedan B. He left Sedan in 2003, and spent time coaching in Qatar (with Qatar SC) and in China (with Chengdu Blades). He had two spells as manager of Coton Sport, separated by coaching with Moroccan club Difaâ Hassani El Jadidi.

Lavagne left his job as manager of Coton Sport to become manager of the Cameroon national team in October 2011. He was dismissed from this position in September 2012 following poor results. He then became manager of Tunisian club Étoile du Sahel in March 2013, and also later managed Egyptian club Al Ittihad and Saudi club Najran. He took over as manager of Egyptian club Smouha in October 2014, before being sacked in January 2015. After managing Moroccan club MAS Fez, he took over as manager of South African club Free State Stars in June 2016. He was sacked by the club in September 2016.

After managing Sudanese club Al-Hilal and a spell as a coach at French club Le Havre, in December 2018 he became manager of Algerian club CS Constantine.

In January 2021 he became manager of Algerian club JS Kabylie. He left the club in August 2021, and later that month became manager of USM Alger. In December 2021, he was sacked from USM Alger.

In September 2022 he became manager of Tanzanian club Azam.

On 18 January 2023, Lavagne was appointed as manager of Saudi Arabian club Al-Jabalain.

References

1964 births
Living people
Sportspeople from Béziers
Association football defenders
French footballers
Le Havre AC players
FC Rouen players
AS Béziers Hérault (football) players
Olympique Alès players
French football managers
Olympique Alès non-playing staff
Nîmes Olympique non-playing staff
SC Bastia non-playing staff
ASOA Valence non-playing staff
CS Sedan Ardennes non-playing staff
Qatar SC non-playing staff
Chengdu Tiancheng F.C. non-playing staff
Coton Sport FC de Garoua managers
Difaâ Hassani El Jadidi managers
Cameroon national football team managers
Étoile Sportive du Sahel managers
Al Ittihad Alexandria Club managers
Najran SC managers
Smouha SC managers
Maghreb de Fès managers
Free State Stars F.C. managers
Al-Hilal Club (Omdurman) managers
Le Havre AC non-playing staff
CS Constantine managers
Saudi Professional League managers
Saudi First Division League managers
French expatriate football managers
French expatriate sportspeople in Qatar
Expatriate football managers in Qatar
French expatriate sportspeople in China
Expatriate football managers in China
French expatriate sportspeople in Cameroon
Expatriate football managers in Cameroon
French expatriate sportspeople in Morocco
Expatriate football managers in Morocco
French expatriate sportspeople in Tunisia
Expatriate football managers in Tunisia
French expatriate sportspeople in Egypt
Expatriate football managers in Egypt
French expatriate sportspeople in Saudi Arabia
Expatriate football managers in Saudi Arabia
French expatriate sportspeople in South Africa
Expatriate soccer managers in South Africa
French expatriate sportspeople in Sudan
Expatriate football managers in Sudan
French expatriate sportspeople in Algeria
Expatriate football managers in Algeria
French expatriate sportspeople in Tanzania
Expatriate football managers in Tanzania
USM Alger managers
Footballers from Occitania (administrative region)